Ardena is an unincorporated community located within Howell Township in Monmouth County, New Jersey, United States. The community is located along County Route 524 near Vanderveer Road in the western part of the township. The area consists of about half farmland and half residential developments.

References

Neighborhoods in Howell Township, New Jersey
Unincorporated communities in Monmouth County, New Jersey
Unincorporated communities in New Jersey